The United States Adult Soccer Association Region I, is one of the four regions in the USASA. This region is for USASA-affiliated soccer clubs that play in the Northeast corridor of the United States.

Member Associations 
Connecticut
Delaware
Maine
Maryland
Massachusetts
New Hampshire
New Jersey
New York (two associations, east and west)
Pennsylvania (two associations, east and west)
Rhode Island
Vermont
Virginia/District of Columbia
West Virginia
Within Region I there are also two "Regional Leagues" the CLS & MSSL

Leagues

References

External links
 USASA
 List of USASA Region I affiliated leagues

Region I